The Cihanbeyli by-election of 2002 was a by-election held in the district of Cihanbeyli, Konya Province in order to elect a new mayor. Due to the large Kurdish population in the district, the election was won by the Kurdish nationalist Democratic People's Party (DEHAP). The newly formed Justice and Development Party (AKP), which went on to win the general elections held the same year, came a close second while the centre-left Republican People's Party (CHP) came third. 178 ballot boxes were used in the election for 37,066 registered voters.

Results

References

2002 elections in Turkey
By-elections in Turkey